AutoMotion is a mobile application management (MAM) platform for car buyers, OEMs, and automotive dealers headquartered in Minneapolis, MN, United States. The company supplies automotive data and consumer software products for large technology platforms.

History
AutoMotion's launch was featured in Automotive News as one of their "10 cool technologies".  The company partnered with JATO Dynamics and Dominion Enterprises. 

In 2013 General Motors selected the AutoMotion product as a mobile app provider approved for IMR certification. In partnership with Microsoft the company launched a Windows 8 version of the platform. Group 1 Automotive was the first large automotive retailer to release mobile apps for each of its dealerships in 2014. The company unveiled a consumer brand in 2018.

The founder, Ben Anderson, was awarded several state, regional, and global awards for student entrepreneurship including Young Entrepreneur of the Year by the Small Business Administration.

Products and services
The AutoMotion platform manages data and mobile software applications for manufacturers and dealers in the automotive industry.

See also
 Mobile Application Management (MAM)
 Mobile application development
 Online Video Platform (OVP)
 Video production

References

External links
 AutoMotionTV information page

Additional information
 Businessweek article
 Star Tribune article
 Pentair Prize Winner

Companies based in Minneapolis
Software companies based in Minnesota
Video hosting
Software companies of the United States